The Église Saint-Ferréol les Augustins is a Roman Catholic church in Marseille.

Location
The church building is located on the Old Port of Marseille. The exact address is Quai des Belges, 13001 Marseille.

History
The original building on site was owned by the Knights Templar. However, in 1369, it was given to a community of Augustinian hermits. By 1447, they decided to spearhead the construction a new church building. It was dedicated in 1542, even though the vault was only completed in 1588. 

During the Ancien Régime (15th century to 18th century), it was used for professional ceremonies. For example, ship-porters had their own altars in the church as early as 1390: one dedicated to Saint Peter, and a second one to Saint Paul.

Pope Clement VII (1478–1534) married his niece, Catherine de' Medici (1519–1589), to Henry II of France (1519–1559), in this church on October 28, 1533.

During the French Revolution of 1789, it came close to being destroyed. However, it was salvaged. Shortly after, it was renamed in honour of Saint Augustine. Later, it was sold to a businessman. Later, it was returned to the Catholic Church.

The facade was destroyed in 1801, due to construction work on the street, and it was rebuilt in 1875. In 1803, it was named in honour of Saint Ferréol de Vienne, a Roman Catholic martyr from the 3rd century who was the namesake of another church in Marseille which was destroyed during the French Revolution.

The high altar was designed by Dominique Fossaty, as were the altars of the Augustinians and of the ship-porters. Inside the church can also be found the Mazenod family's tomb dating back to 1564 and the Montolieu family's tomb, dating back to 1695. The relics of Saint Louis of Toulouse (1274–1297) are also in the church.

The church has a few works of art. Three paintings by Michel Serre (1658-1733) are displayed inside the church: Sainte Marguerite, La Vierge à l'enfant apparaissant à Saint Pierre and Saint Paul. There is also a bust of Saint Ferréol de Vienne. Additionally, there is a sculpture of Saint Augustine designed by Raymond Servian (1903-1953). Another sculpture, by Élie-Jean Vézien (1890-1982), represents Saint Theresa. Yet another sculpture, this time by Louis Botinelly (1883-1962), is of Joan of Arc. A more recently sculpture, designed by Yves le Pape in 1979, depicts the Holy Family.

The neogothic pipe organ, designed by Augustin Zieger, dates back to 1844.

At present
The church building is open every weekday from 9AM to 6:30PM. Mass is said every weekday at 12PM and 6PM, every Saturday at 6PM, every Sunday at 9:30AM, 11AM and 7PM.

Gallery

See also

List of works by Louis Botinelly

References

Roman Catholic churches in Marseille
16th-century Roman Catholic church buildings in France
Roman Catholic churches completed in 1588
Augustinian churches in France